Austad is a former municipality of the former Vest-Agder county, Norway.  The  municipality existed from 1909 until its dissolution in 1963.  The municipality encompassed the area surrounding the Rosfjorden in the southern, coastal part of the present-day municipality of Lyngdal.  The administrative centre of the municipality was the village of Austad where Austad Church is located.

Name
The municipality (originally the parish) is named after the old Austad farm.  The first element of the name is derived from the male name "" and the last element is "stad" which means "homestead" or "farm".

History
Austad municipality was created on 1 January 1909 when the old municipality of Lyngdal was divided into three separate municipalities: Lyngdal, Austad, and Kvås. Upon its creation, Austad had a population of 1,263.  On 7 January 1916, there was a small border adjustment which transferred a small area (population: 4) from Austad to the neighboring municipality of Spind. During the 1960s, there were many municipal mergers across Norway due to the work of the Schei Committee. On 1 January 1963, Austad and Kvås were re-incorporated into Lyngdal along with the Gitlevågområdet area of Spangereid. Prior to the merger, Austad had a population of 608.

Government
All municipalities in Norway, including Austad, are responsible for primary education (through 10th grade), outpatient health services, senior citizen services, unemployment and other social services, zoning, economic development, and municipal roads.  The municipality was governed by a municipal council of elected representatives, which in turn elected a mayor.

Municipal council
The municipal council  of Austad was made up of representatives that were elected to four year terms.  The party breakdown of the final municipal council was as follows:

See also
List of former municipalities of Norway

References

Lyngdal
Former municipalities of Norway
1909 establishments in Norway
1963 disestablishments in Norway